Ananda Jyothi is a 1993 Indian Kannada-language romantic drama film directed by Chi. Datta Raj and based on the novel Maangalya Maale by Kakolu Saroja Rao. The film starred Shiva Rajkumar and Sudharani. The film had a musical score by Vijay Anand and was jointly produced by Rockline Venkatesh and Chi Guru Dutt.

Cast
 Shiva Rajkumar as Anand
 Sudharani as Jyothi
 Chi Guru Dutt
 Rockline Venkatesh
 K. S. Ashwath
 Thoogudeepa Srinivas
 Megha
 Girija Lokesh
 Sumithra
 Anjali Sudhakar

Release
The film was released on 21 September 1993 all over Karnataka.

Soundtrack
All the songs are composed and scored by Vijayanand with the lyrics by Chi. Udaya Shankar.

References

1993 films
1990s Kannada-language films
Films based on Indian novels
Indian romantic drama films
1993 romantic drama films
Films scored by Vijayanand